Cockpole Green is a hamlet in Berkshire, England. Part, including the original village green, lies within the civil parish of Hurley (where according to the Post Office in the 2011 Census the majority of the population is included) in the borough of Windsor and Maidenhead, and part within the civil parish of Wargrave in Wokingham Borough. Therefore, it is served by two unitary authorities.

Hamlets in Berkshire
Borough of Wokingham
Royal Borough of Windsor and Maidenhead